Nan Jeon University of Science and Technology (NJU) was a private university in Yanshuei District, Tainan, Taiwan.

NJU offers undergraduate programs in fields such as Mechanical Engineering, Electrical Engineering, Chemical Engineering, Information Management, Business Administration, and Hospitality Management. It also offers graduate programs in fields such as Mechanical Engineering, Electrical Engineering, Chemical Engineering, Information Management, and Business Administration.

History
The school was originally established as Nan Jeon Junior College of Technology on 30 June 1967. In 1993, the school was promoted to be Nan Jeon Junior College of Technology and Commerce and to Nan Jeon Institute of Technology in 2001. Finally, in 2013 it became Nan Jeon University of Science and Technology. The university closed down on 1 February 2020.

Campus
The university occupied an area of 9.02 hectares with a total floor space of 7.21 hectares.

Faculties
 Group of Business and Management
 Group of Engineering
 Group of Humanities and Social Science

Transportation
The university was accessible by car within less than 40 minutes from Xinying Station of the Taiwan Railways.

See also
 List of universities in Taiwan

References

External links

  

1967 establishments in Taiwan
2020 disestablishments in Taiwan
Defunct universities and colleges in Taiwan
Educational institutions disestablished in 2020
Educational institutions established in 1967